The 1991 Spanish Grand Prix (formally the XXXIII Gran Premio Tío Pepe de España) was a Formula One motor race held on 29 September 1991 at the Circuit de Catalunya. It was the fourteenth race of the 1991 Formula One World Championship, and the first Spanish Grand Prix to be held at Catalunya.

The 65-lap race was won by British driver Nigel Mansell, driving a Williams-Renault, after he started from second position. Frenchman Alain Prost finished second in a Ferrari, with Mansell's Italian teammate Riccardo Patrese third. Mansell's Drivers' Championship rival, Brazilian Ayrton Senna, finished fifth in his McLaren-Honda, meaning that he led Mansell by 16 points with two races remaining.

Pre-race
There was a lot of action in the backrooms in the week separating the Portuguese and Spanish Grands Prix with the big news being that Max Mosley was elected president of the FISA, replacing Jean-Marie Balestre. There were also changes in the driver line-ups as Michael Bartels returned to Lotus replacing Johnny Herbert who had obligations in the Japanese Formula 3000. Jordan had replaced Roberto Moreno with young Italian rookie Alessandro Zanardi, and Fondmetal had sacked Olivier Grouillard and replaced him with Gabriele Tarquini of AGS, Grouillard promptly taking Tarquini's old seat. Championship challenger Nigel Mansell was limping all weekend, the Williams driver having injured his ankle in a football match.

Qualifying

Pre-qualifying report
The pre-qualifying pool in Spain was reduced to seven entrants when Coloni driver Pedro Chaves refused to drive the car, frustrated at the lack of testing and the non-payment of his retainer. The team were unable to find another driver to attempt to pre-qualify the C4, so it stayed in the garage. Chaves had failed to pre-qualify on all 13 of his attempts this season, and did not drive for the team again.

Brabham secured their fifth consecutive 1–2 in the pre-qualifying session, with Martin Brundle a couple of tenths of a second faster than Mark Blundell. The third placed pre-qualifier, Michele Alboreto in the Footwork, was over two seconds behind Blundell. On his first outing for Fondmetal after the sacking of Olivier Grouillard, Gabriele Tarquini took the last pre-qualifying spot in the Fomet-1, 0.25 seconds behind Alboreto.

Alex Caffi missed out again in fifth place in the other Footwork, just 0.062 seconds slower than Tarquini. It was his fifth failure to pre-qualify in six attempts. Sixth was Fabrizio Barbazza in the AGS, just over half a second faster than his new team-mate Grouillard. It was to be their last appearances for the team as AGS withdrew from Formula One before the next event, having spent six seasons at the top level.

Pre-qualifying classification

Qualifying report 
In qualifying Gerhard Berger did a favour to teammate Ayrton Senna by taking pole position from Mansell, Senna, Riccardo Patrese, Michael Schumacher, Alain Prost, Jean Alesi, Ivan Capelli, Emanuele Pirro and Nelson Piquet.

Qualifying classification

Race

Race report
On race morning it was raining, but by start time it had stopped, although the track was still wet. At the start Senna got away well and challenged Berger, while Mansell was right on his tail. Toward the end of lap one Schumacher surprised Mansell to take third place. At the back Éric Bernard and Érik Comas collided, both men being out on the spot. The track was incredibly slippery and there was a lot of action at the front with Senna, Schumacher, Mansell, and Alesi all fighting over third place, while Berger started to scamper away in the lead. Mansell tried to chase the leader and forced his way past Schumacher before setting off after Senna. Eventually he pounced on the main straight, the two great rivals going wheel to wheel, just millimetres apart, with Mansell taking the position and setting off after Berger. Prost was the first front-runner to stop for dry tyres, followed shortly by leader Berger, who had a very bad stop. Mansell and Senna both stopped on the same lap and it was the McLaren team who won the confrontation, getting Senna out ahead and into the lead from Berger, Mansell, and Schumacher.

On the following lap Senna let Berger through as Mansell was closing in. The rain returned and Senna had a dramatic spin at the last corner, dropping from second to fifth while Schumacher passed Prost for third. Mansell closed on Berger, and on lap 20 he made his way up the inside to take the lead and proceeded to pull away, while Berger came under pressure from the charging Schumacher. A close battle ended when Schumacher spun while trying to pass, he would stay in the race, but down in sixth place, which would become fifth when Berger retired with yet another electronic failure. The action continued for the major placings as Patrese passed Senna for third then Alesi blew past Senna for fourth after Schumacher pitted. Mansell duly took victory from Prost, Patrese, Alesi, Senna, and Schumacher, while the Minardi drivers ended the race red faced due to a last lap collision between Gianni Morbidelli and Pierluigi Martini. Mansell's win with Senna fifth meant that the title race was back on, but Senna still led by sixteen points as the teams headed on to Japan.

Race classification

Championship standings after the race

Drivers' Championship standings

Constructors' Championship standings

References

Spanish Grand Prix
Spanish Grand Prix
Grand Prix